Peter Ågren is a Swedish songwriter, producer, musician and artist. Credits include The Amplifetes, Tove Styrke, Peter, Bjorn & John and Little Majorette.

He started his career as singer for Swedish powerpop band Grass Show. He went on to sign with renowned publishing company Murlyn Music as a songwriter. In 2008, he joined Swedish electro pop project The Amplifetes, together with Henrik Jonback, Henrik Korpi and Tommy Spaanheden.

Ågren works from his stockholm based studio, frequently collaborating with other writers.

Discography (selection)

2021
Little Majorette's Waves (Writer/Producer/Mixer)
 "Not Mine"
 "Les Chasseurs Et Les Cueilleurs"
 "Dear Satellite"
 "Modern Ones"

2019
The Man's Lake, Ocean or Sea (2013) (Writer/Producer/Mixer)
 "Hold On To Nothing"
 "It's A Fever"
 "What I'd Do"
 "Sang For You"
 "A New Song"
 "These Streets"
 "I Don't Mind The Rain"
 "Alright For Now"
 "At Home In Water"
 "There Will Be Rain"
 "Thinking About Leaving"
 "Brought It All On Myself"
 "Never Grown Up"

2016
Peter, Bjorn & John's Breakin' Point
 "A Long Goodbye" (Writer)

2015
Ninsun Poli's Great Leap Forward
 "Great Leap Forward" (Writer/Producer/Mixer)

Lo-Fi-Fnk's Nightclub Nirvana
 "Pirate Radio" (Writer/Producer)
 "Lion's Pride" (Writer/Producer)

2014
Peter Morén's Broken Swenglish VOL 2
 "The Odyssey" (Writer/Producer)

Mr Little Jeans' Pocketknife
 "Valentine" (Writer/Producer)

2012
The Amplifetes' Where Is The Light (Writer/Producer/Artist)
 "Interlude - House Call"
 "Where Is The Light"
 "You Want It"
 "My Heart Is Leaving Town"
 "You/Me/Evolution" 
 "Tracey Clark"
 "Keep On Running"
 "Start:Stop"
 "Never Going Back"
 "S.E.O.K.L"
 "This Can't Be It"

Peter Morén's Pyramiden
 "Odyssén" (Writer/Producer)
 "Capri, Cannes & Brighton" (Musician)
 "Säg Mitt Namn" (Musician)
 "Erik M. Nilsson" (Musician)
 "Tröstpriset" (Musician)
 "Budbäraren" (Musician)

2011
Tove Styrke's Tove Styrke 2011 Re-release
 "Call My Name" (Writer/Producer)

2010
Tove Styrke's Tove Styrke
 "White Light Moment" (Writer/Producer)
 "Close Enough" (Writer/Producer)
 "Walking My Daydream" (Writer/Producer)

The Amplifetes' The Amplifetes (Writer/Producer/Artist)
 "Intro"
 "It's My Life"
 "Maxine"
 "Somebody New"
 "Blinded By The Moonlight"
 "When The Music Died"
 "There She Walks" (Mixer)
 "A Million Men" (Mixer)
 "There Will Never Be Another One"
 "Fokker"
 "It Can't Rain All The Time"

Sara Schiralli's Bang Bang
 "Need Some Feeding" (Writer/Producer/Mixer)
 "You Don't Miss What You Never Had" (Writer/Producer/Mixer)
 "This Moment" (Writer/Producer/Mixer)
 "So Raw" (Writer/Producer/Mixer)

References

1969 births
Swedish songwriters
Swedish male singers
Living people